SM U-65 was one of the 329 submarines serving in the Imperial German Navy in World War I.
U-65 was engaged in the naval warfare and took part in the First Battle of the Atlantic.

Operations 
U-65. Kaptlt. Hermann von Fischel. On completion at Kiel did trials at Kiel School about May and June 1916, afterwards proceeding to the North Sea to join 4th Flotilla.

? 11–14 July 1916. North Sea patrol.
16–24 July 1916. North Sea patrol.
17–21 August 1916. North Sea patrol, attacked minesweeper Haldon 20 August.
3–4 September 1916. North Sea patrol. Returned with defects.
26 October – 19 November 1916. To Mediterranean, northabout. Sank nothing. On arrival at Cattaro joined the Pola-Cattaro Flotilla.
28 November – 7 December 1916. Left Cattaro and on 1 December probably sank a steamer. The submarine was badly rammed by Caledonia and appears to have returned home immediately on the surface.
 17 February 1917. Sank troopship  (12,644 tons). 754 casualties. 
29 March – 19/20 April 1917. In western Mediterranean sank 4 steamships, 5 sailing vessels (13,000 tons).
14 May – 9 June 1917. Possible cruise of U-65.
The next cruise of U-65 which can be reconstructed with probability was from 10 to 31 January or 1 February 1918. On this cruise she sank 2 steamers and 1 sailing vessel, and was twice attacked from the air and once by depth-charged by Campanula, which she missed by torpedo.
A later possible cruise was for about the first 3 weeks of September 1918, on which she sank 4 steamers and damaged 4 more, between longitudes 8° and 17°E.
At the end of October 1918 she was scuttled by the Germans at Pola or Cattaro.

Summary of raiding history

See also 
Room 40
Anti-submarine warfare
U-boat Campaign (World War I)

References

Notes

Citations

Bibliography

External links
Photos of cruises of German submarine U-54 in 1916-1918.
A 44 min. German film from 1917 about a cruise of the German submarine U-35.

Room 40:  original documents, photos and maps about World War I German submarine warfare and British Room 40 Intelligence from The National Archives, Kew, Richmond, UK.

Type U 63 submarines
World War I submarines of Germany
1916 ships
U-boats commissioned in 1916
Ships built in Kiel
U-boats scuttled in 1918
Maritime incidents in 1918
World War I shipwrecks in the Adriatic Sea